Baker Street is a street in London.

Baker Street may also refer to:

"Baker Street" (song) by Gerry Rafferty, first released in 1978
Baker Street (album), a 1998 compilation album by Gerry Rafferty
Baker Street (comics), published between 1989 and 1991
Baker Street, a working title for the 2008 feature film The Bank Job
Baker Street (musical) (1965), based on Sherlock Holmes
Baker Street (Nelson, BC), a historic street in Canada
Baker Street, Essex, a location near Grays Thurrock in England
Baker Street tube station on the London Underground
Baker Street Station (Fort Wayne, Indiana), a former Pennsylvania Railroad station in Indiana
"Baker Street", a euphemism for the Special Operations Executive, a British World War II organisation
Baker Street, Singapore, a road in Seletar

See also
221B Baker Street (disambiguation)